Jean-Christophe Guinchard (born 1 November 1967) is an athlete from Switzerland.  He competes in triathlon.

Guinchard competed at the first Olympic triathlon at the 2000 Summer Olympics.  He took 24th place with a total time of 1:50:50.76.

References

1967 births
Living people
Swiss male triathletes
Olympic triathletes of Switzerland
Triathletes at the 2000 Summer Olympics